The 1982–83 UNLV Runnin' Rebels basketball team represented the University of Nevada Las Vegas in NCAA Division I men's competition in the 1982–83 season under head coach Jerry Tarkanian. The team played its final season of home games at the Las Vegas Convention Center, and was a member of the Pacific Coast Athletic Association (PCAA), now known as the Big West Conference. The Rebels won the first 24 games of the season and ascended to No. 1 in both major polls. UNLV captured the regular season conference title, then defeated Fresno State in the championship game of the PCAA Tournament. The team finished with a record of 28–3 (15–1 PCAA). As No. 3 seed in the West region, the Rebels were beaten in the second round of the NCAA tournament by eventual National champion NC State, 71–70.

Roster

Schedule and results

|-
!colspan=12 style=| Regular season

|-
!colspan=12 style=| PCAA tournament

|-
!colspan=12 style=| NCAA tournament

Rankings

^Coaches did not release a Week 1 poll.

Awards and honors
Sidney Green – PCAA Player of the Year

See also
UNLV Runnin' Rebels basketball
1983 NCAA Division I men's basketball tournament

References

Unlv
UNLV Runnin' Rebels basketball seasons
Unlv
UNLV Runnin' Rebels basketball team
UNLV Runnin' Rebels basketball team